Yorishige is a masculine Japanese given name.

Possible writings
Yorishige can be written using different combinations of kanji characters. Here are some examples: 

頼重, "rely, heavy"
頼茂, "rely, luxuriant"
頼繁, "rely, prosperous/complexity"
依重, "to depend on, heavy"
依茂, "to depend on, luxuriant"
依繁, "to depend on, prosperous/complexity"

The name can also be written in hiragana よりしげ or katakana ヨリシゲ.

Notable people with the name
Yorishige Arima (有馬 頼咸, 1828–1881), Japanese samurai of late Edo period
 (1622–1695), Japanese daimyō
 (1516–1542), Japanese samurai

Japanese masculine given names